Keifer Creek is a stream in St. Louis County in the U.S. state of Missouri. It is a tributary of the Meramec River.

A variant spelling was "Keefer Creek". The creek has the name of the local Keefer family.

See also
List of rivers of Missouri

References

Rivers of St. Louis County, Missouri
Rivers of Missouri